Nader Jahangiri (born 1945) is an Iranian linguist and emeritus professor of linguistics at Ferdowsi University of Mashhad. He is known for his research on sociolinguistics.

Books
 Gilaki Dialect of Lahijan, Research Institute for Languages and Cultures of Asia and Africa, 2003 
 A Sociolinguistic Study of Persian in Tehran, Institute for the Study of Languages and Cultures of Asia and Africa, 2000 
 Acoustic Phonetics, Dennis Fry, translated by N. Jahangiri, Ferdowsi University of Mashhad

References

External links
 Nader Jahangiri at Ferdowsi University of Mashhad

1945 births
Living people
Linguists from Iran
Phoneticians
English–Persian translators
Sociolinguists
Alumni of University College London
Academic staff of Ferdowsi University of Mashad
Faculty of Letters and Humanities of the University of Tehran alumni